Fuzzy Door Productions is an American film and television production company founded by Seth MacFarlane in 1998. The company's productions include animated series Family Guy, American Dad!, the Family Guy spinoff The Cleveland Show, the live-action sitcom The Winner, the science documentary series Cosmos: A Spacetime Odyssey and the sci-fi comedy drama series The Orville. More recently, it signed a deal with NBCUniversal. The company will move from its longtime home at the 20th Century Fox Studios lot in Century City to NBCUniversal's Universal City Studios in Universal City. Erica Huggins will continue to head Fuzzy Door as president. MacFarlane's two animated series Family Guy broadcast on Fox and American Dad! broadcast on TBS will continue to be produced on the Fox studios lot while his live action series The Orville which is scheduled to air its second extended season on Hulu will continue to be filmed at Universal City Studios and in Westlake, California.

The name of the company comes from the leopard-printed fake fur-covered door to the house MacFarlane lived in when he was attending Rhode Island School of Design as an undergraduate in animation. The house itself also went by the nickname the Fuzzy Door during MacFarlane's residence and was the location of many "Fuzzy Door" parties. The Fuzzy Door Productions logo was designed by Cory Brookes, a friend and housemate of Seth's at the Fuzzy Door residence. The logo was updated in 2019, featuring a more abstract design of the door and no longer featuring the fur-pattern design, instead colored in a plain white with blue background. In 2020, the new logo was enhanced, featuring the door animating open and the text irising in as it does so, over a background that's a darker shade of blue.

Series

Television series

Web series

Films

Shorts

Discography
 No One Ever Tells You (2015) – Seth MacFarlane
 In Full Swing (2017) – Seth MacFarlane
 Once in a While (2019) – Seth MacFarlane
 Great Songs from Stage & Screen (2020) — Seth MacFarlane
 Blue Skies (2022) – Seth MacFarlane

References

 
Adult animation studios
American animation studios
American companies established in 1998
American record labels
Companies based in Los Angeles
Film production companies of the United States
Jazz record labels
Labels distributed by Universal Music Group
Mass media companies established in 1998
Record labels based in California
Television production companies of the United States
1998 establishments in California